Apotoforma uncifera is a species of moth of the family Tortricidae. It is found in South Africa.

The wingspan is about 12 mm. The ground colour of the forewings is yellowish, with a brownish pattern.

References

Endemic moths of South Africa
Moths described in 1964
Tortricini
Moths of Africa